The Tiny greenbul has been split into 2 species:
 Lowland tiny greenbul, 	  Phyllastrephus debilis
 Montane tiny greenbul, 	  Phyllastrephus albigula

Animal common name disambiguation pages